The Dereemer Ranch Historic District, near Horse Creek, Wyoming, is a  historic district (United States) which was listed on the National Register of Historic Places in 1983.  The listing included seven contributing buildings.

References

Ranches in Wyoming
National Register of Historic Places in Laramie County, Wyoming